Cotachena fuscimarginalis is a moth in the family Crambidae. It was described by George Hampson in 1916. It is found in New Guinea and Australia.

References

Moths described in 1916
Spilomelinae